The 2007 Bassetlaw District Council election took place on 3 May 2007 to elect members of Bassetlaw District Council in Nottinghamshire, England. One third of the council was up for election.

Election result

Ward results

Blyth

Carlton

East Markham

East Retford East

East Retford North

Harworth

Rampton

Ranskill

Sturton

Welbeck

Worksop East

Worksop North

Worksop North East

Worksop North West

Worksop South

Worksop South East

References

2007 Bassetlaw election result

2007 English local elections
2007
2000s in Nottinghamshire